The New Zealand national cricket team toured Australia in the 1993–94 season to play in three test matches against Australia before playing in a tri-series with South Africa. The tour began on October 19, in Perth, Western Australia, against an Australian Chairman XI as they played in five warm-up matches before the test matches in Perth, Hobart and Brisbane. New Zealand were captained by Martin Crowe while the Australians were captain by Allan Border.

Before the first test, the tourists played in five tour matches, three first-class and two list A matches. In the first test which was played at the WACA Ground, centuries from Ian Healy, Mark Taylor and Andrew Jones would see the match end in a draw. New Zealand than suffering their biggest innings defeat in their history in the second test held at the Bellerive Oval. After Australia had scored 6/544, New Zealand was bowled out for 161 in both innings to lose by an innings and 222 runs. The final test match held at the Brisbane Cricket Ground saw the same result with Australia winning by an innings to take out the Trans-Tasman Trophy 2–0. Kiwi batsman, Andrew Jones was the top run-scorer of the series with 324 runs while Shane Warne was the leading wicket-taker in the series with 18 wickets.

Background
Heading into the tour, the Australians had previously head over to England for the 1993 Ashes Series as they won the series 4-1 which saw the batting of David Boon, Mark Waugh, Allan Border all scoring over 430 runs throughout the test series. Another critical factor for Australia was Shane Warne who claimed 34 wickets throughout the series as he was aided by Merv Hughes (31 wickets) who wouldn't be selected for the test series against New Zealand. New Zealand's last series was against Australia at home when they tied the series in the tests before only just losing the ODI Series 3-2.

Squads

On the 27 October 1993, David White was selected to fly into Australia as a backup to Mark Greatbatch who was carrying an injury leading into the test series. The first test squad for Australia was revealed on the 9 November, with a call-up to debutant Glenn McGrath who had only played eight first-class matches for New South Wales. After the first test match, Martin Crowe returned home after an injury to his left knee. Ken Rutherford would replace Crowe as the captain for New Zealand in the remaining two tests.

Tour matches

New Zealand vs. ACB Chairman XI
The opening tour match for New Zealand took place at the Lilac Hill in Perth against a ACB Chairman XI which featured Jeff Thomson, Dennis Lillee and Richard Hadlee who were all over forty years old. After forcing New Zealand to be 8/91 at one stage, a ninth wicket partnership between Blair Pocock and Willie Watson rescued New Zealand to a score of 189. In the run-chase, Damien Martyn top scored with 81 as he got the man of the match award as he led the Chairman team to a six wicket victory.

New Zealand vs. Western Australia
New Zealand stayed in Perth to play their second warm-up against a Western Australia side. Batting first, New Zealand was bowled out for 149 with Western Australian bowler, Jo Angel taking five wickets for 32. In response, Western Australia scored 508 with an partnership of 185 runs from test-fringe hopefuls, Damien Martyn (80) and Tom Moody (110) being completed in only 214 minutes. Tim Zoehrer also chipped in with a solid 83 as he pushed the total past 500. In the second innings, half-centuries from Andrew Jones, Ken Rutherford and Dipak Patel got New Zealand to 350 with Jo Angel taking another five wickets as Western Australia won by an innings and nine runs. The match though would see Justin Langer fined $300 for refusing to walk after being dismissed with Martin Crowe doing a similar response the following day.

New Zealand vs. AIS Cricket Academy XI
New Zealand headed over to North Sydney Oval to take on an Cricket Academy XI which featured Glenn McGrath who would go on to play in his first test later in the tour. For the tourists, they would have their third loss of the tour with only a Tony Blain 40 resembling some fight in the 110 run defeat. Chris Cairns being the best New Zealand bowler with 4/39.

New Zealand vs. New South Wales
Two days later, New Zealand took on New South Wales in a four-day first-class match played at the No. 1 Sports Ground in Newcastle. The opening day of the tour match saw an partnership of 119 between Mark Waugh (63) and Steve Waugh (88) before Dipak Patel brought the game back with 6/87 from 23 consecutive overs to bring New South Wales from 3/218 to declare at 8/299. New Zealand first innings didn't get going with Martin Crowe maintaining his bad form as he scored 12 runs in his innings. Eventually an 65 run innings from Ken Rutherford pushed New Zealand to 163 in their first innings. With a target of 246 runs for victory after New South Wales collapsed for 109 in the second innings, New Zealand chased down the target with three wickets to spare with Danny Morrison and Tony Blain contributing the remaining runs on the fourth day.

New Zealand vs. Tasmania
The final tour match before the first test saw New Zealand head down to Launceston for a four-day game against Tasmania at the NTCA Ground. After New Zealand won the toss and elected to field, Tasmanian batsman David Boon only lasted ten minutes in his first match of the season. The contribution was shared between the Tasmanian batsman with batsman getting starts before getting out. Only Shaun Young and Mark Atkinson contributed half-centuries while Chris Cairns took five wickets. New Zealand responded with 7/215 before declaring as Andrew Jones top-scored with 67 before running himself out late in the second day. This was followed up by another declaration from Tasmania in their second innings with Ricky Ponting top-scoring for Tasmania with 54 as David Boon only scored 21 as he was out early in his innings. Chasing 299 for victory, Martin Crowe was dropped twice (on 17 and 46) as he went on to score his 53rd century and his first of the tour as he top scored with 105. But the match would end in a draw with New Zealand scoring 7/247 with Troy Cooley being the pick of the bowlers with two wickets.

New Zealand vs. South Australia
During the break between the first and second test, New Zealand played in a four day practice match against a South Australia eleven at Adelaide Oval. Despite winning the toss, the South Australia were bowled out for 158 with Doull claiming six wickets. In response, they declared on 6/276 with Damion Reevees being the pick of the bowlers with 4/62 with leg-spinner Peter McIntyre not bowling after chipping his right forefinger while batting. After the New Zealand innings was closed during Day 3, South Australia reached 9/260 with James Brayshaw top scoring with 94 in the innings which took four hours in what The Age called it the 'blandest 247' at the end of Day 3. New Zealand would go on to chase down the target of 144 that was set which was set by a 131 run opening stand between Greatbatch (64) and Pocock (60). This was despite South Australia taking three late wickets for only four runs with Patel securing the victory with a single.

Test series

1st Test

Heading into the first test, Mark Greatbatch was brought back into the test side after damaging his finger earlier in the tour as David White went home due to a torn knee cartilage from the match against Tasmania. New Zealand coach stated before the match "For Australia, the Ashes tour of England is the big tour; this is the equivalent of an Ashes tour for us." The first test saw two players made their test debutant with Kiwi batsman, Blair Pocock opening the batting while Glenn McGrath debut for Australia.

The match started two hours later than the schedule time after overnight rain vividly made the pitch greener as the curators prolong the close-mowing to remove the green smear that was on the pitch. Selecting to bowl first, Cairns rifled the Australian batsman with his first delivery striking Michael Slater in the midriff because taking the wicket of Slater and in the next ball, Boon to put Australia 2/37. After preventing the hat-trick, Steve Waugh with opening batsman Mark Taylor (who would go on to make 63) dug in to bring the score up to 100 as the Australians would make 6/229 at the end of stumps which was drawn an hour late. The following day, Ian Healy recorded his second century of his test career which after the end of the day, he stated, "It was a little gesture to my father, Neville, whose father passed away yesterday,". He was guided by some late order hitting from Paul Reiffel (51) and Craig McDermott (35) as he guided Australia to 398 from the position of 6/198 at one stage.

McGrath recorded his first test wicket with his 27th ball as New Zealand loss Mark Greatbach for 18. Blair Pocock was the next to fall on 34 with Jones ending the day on 62* with New Zealand being at 2/123 at stumps. Jones would go on to score 143 before being dismissed by Mark Waugh caught behind. Cairns also contributed to the bat with 66 (would go on to reach 78) which included a six over mid-off from Shane Warne's bowling in what was his highest test score. Ken Rutherford (17) though would contribute to being Craig McDermott's 200th wicket. The fourth day would see New Zealand declare on 9/419 with Watson tearing a hamstring while running for a single which prevented him from bowling the rest of the match.

Australia's second innings saw the team only lose one wicket through the entire innings with the wicket of Michael Slater falling on 99 after he feathered a delivery from Patel into the gloves of Patel. A century from Mark Taylor saw Australia declare on 1/323 from their 87 overs with Greg Baum from The Age stating that they batted on for at least half an hour too long. This forced the match into a draw with New Zealand only getting to 166 before the match was declared a draw. For Crowe it was his last match of the tour with the pain in his left knee being more intolerable throughout the test match as he missed the remaining two test matches with Rutherford becoming captain.

2nd Test

Leading into the test, Australia made one change to their eleven with Glenn McGrath being dropped for Tim May. For New Zealand, they made two changes with Richard de Groen appearing in his first test with Chris Harris replacing Crowe due to injury. Batting first, the Australians dominated the opening day of the test as New Zealand had five missed chances for only two wickets in return. For Australia, Slater's footwork was nimble and after almost a run-out on 99, lead the batting with 168 run innings. David Boon recorded his 18th century with the television stations not automatically switching over to the news as it took him seven minutes to go from 99 to 100. He would only score one more run on the second day with Australia eventually declaring on 6/544 with Mark Waugh becoming the third Australian in the innings to get a century as he made 111 runs over 139 balls. Only Richard de Groen took more than one wicket in the Australian innings, getting Mark Waugh and Healy out.

With the winds swirling on the Derwent, Australia dropped three catches with Healy, Boon and Warne all dropping catches at certain intervals with New Zealand ending the second day on 2/81. Disaster though would strike on the third day for New Zealand as they collapsed, losing eight wickets for only 80 runs to be bowled out for 161. Tim May taking a five wicket haul for the Aussies as Shane Warne broke the spin-bowling record for a calendar year with 59 wickets. Only Andrew Jones and Tony Blain mustered any residence to the spin bowling of May and Warne. New Zealand was force to follow-on and by the end of the day finished on 5/127 with Ken Ruthford scoring a half-century before being bowled by Warne. The match would end before lunch on Day 4 with Warne taking four wickets while only conceding three runs as he finished with figures of 6/31 as New Zealand was bowled out for 161. For New Zealand this was their heaviest defeat with the previous record being in the 1962-63 tour against England where they lost by 215 runs.

3rd Test

Leading into the third test which was played at the Brisbane Cricket Ground, Chris Cairns stress fracture was cleared with New Zealand coach, Geoff Howarth and captain Rutherford wanting Cairns to play as a batsman but refused that offer. He replaced Chris Harris in the side, while Bryan Young (who replaced Murphy Su'a) was picked to make his test debut despite having four ducks in the tour matches before the test. For Australia, they only made the one change with Glenn McGrath coming in for Paul Reiffel.

Batting first on a pitch manufactured of batsman, New Zealand collapsed from a good position (3/167) to losing 6/26 in eighty minutes to be 9/193 as they finished the opening day on 9/208. The main culprits of the collapse being Shane Warne and Craig McDermott who each got three and four wickets respectively in the innings. For New Zealand, Andrew Jones top scored with 56 which included a partnership of 94 with debutant Young scoring 38. After bowling out New Zealand for 233 early on the second day, Australia would round up with 3/241 with the partnership between David Boon and Mark Waugh hitting another century partnership. Their sixth for the 1993 calendar year. The following day, centuries from Steve Waugh (147*) and Allan Border (105) who was playing in his 150th test built a partnership of 159. This partnership aid in getting Australia to declare on 6/607 early on the fourth day. Only Simon Doull took multiple wickets in the innings with 2/105 from 33 overs.

Chasing 374 to force Australia to bat again, New Zealand could only score 278 in their second innings with the match being played into a fifth day after showers affected the fourth day before the day was abandoned by the umpires. Ken Rutherford top scored for New Zealand with 56 while Shane Warne took four wickets as he not only claimed the man of the match but also man of the series with his 18 wickets across the three tests.

Statistics
After the three tests, Andrew Jones ended up with the most runs of the series with 324 runs from six innings. He was followed by the Australian trio of Slater, Taylor and Boon with Kiwi batsman, Ken Rutherford rounding out the top five. Shane Warne finished the series as the leading wicket taker with 18 wickets from three matches at an average of 16.94 runs per wicket. He was followed by his Australian teammates in McDermott, May, McGrath and Mark Waugh. The leading wicket taker for New Zealand was Chris Cairns who took five wickets.

Most runs

Most wickets

References

External sources
Cricinfo

1993 in Australian cricket
1993 in New Zealand cricket
1993–94 Australian cricket season
1994 in Australian cricket
1994 in New Zealand cricket
International cricket competitions from 1991–92 to 1994
1993-94